KASB (89.9 FM) is a high school radio station broadcasting a Freeform radio format and provides high school student oriented music and news. Licensed to Bellevue, Washington, United States, it serves the Bellevue area.  The station is currently owned by Bellevue School District #405.

External links
 

ASB
High school radio stations in the United States